Nathaniel Russell Williams (born May 2, 1950) is a former professional basketball player. A  swingman from Utah State University, Williams was selected first in the 1971 NBA Hardship Draft, a supplemental draft for college underclassman. He played eight and a half seasons (1971–1979) in the National Basketball Association (NBA) for the Cincinnati Royals/Kansas City-Omaha Kings, New Orleans Jazz, and Golden State Warriors. His finest season took place in 1973–74, when he averaged 15.5 points, 4.2 rebounds, and 2.2 assists for the Kings. He ended his NBA career with 7,709 total points.

References

1950 births
Living people
African-American basketball players
American men's basketball players
Basketball players from Louisiana
Cincinnati Royals draft picks
Cincinnati Royals players
Golden State Warriors players
Kansas City Kings players
New Orleans Jazz players
People from Columbia, Louisiana
Shooting guards
Small forwards
Utah State Aggies men's basketball players
21st-century African-American people
20th-century African-American sportspeople